The Weston Bluff Skirmish Site, on a bluff over the Ohio River just north of Weston, Kentucky, was site of an American Civil War skirmish on June 21, 1864.  A  area was listed on the National Register of Historic Places in 1998.

Confederate soldiers shot at boats at Weston;  Union soldiers shot back.  While minor, the skirmish was the largest military action in Crittenden County, Kentucky during the war.

It was among several sites listed on the National Register as part of a 1998 study.

References

Conflict sites on the National Register of Historic Places in Kentucky
American Civil War on the National Register of Historic Places
National Register of Historic Places in Crittenden County, Kentucky
1864 in Kentucky
Kentucky in the American Civil War